Christian Guay-Poliquin (born 1982) is a Canadian novelist from Quebec. His second novel, Le Poids de la neige, won the Governor General's Award for French-language fiction at the 2017 Governor General's Awards. Guay-Poliquin was born in Saint-Armand, Quebec.

The novel also won the 2017 Prix des collégiens and the 2017 Prix France-Québec.

Works
 Le fil des kilomètres (2013)
 transl. Jacob Homel: Running on Fumes Talonbooks, Vancouver 2016
 (fr) Le poids de la neige La Peuplade, Saguenay 2016 312 pp
 Le poids de la neige. Les éd. de l'observatoire, Paris 2017 256 pp (new version, generated by the author)
 (it) Il peso della neve. Marsilio, Venezia 2018
 (angl.) transl. Jacob Homel: The weight of snow. Talonbooks, Vancouver 2019 ("certain changes to his novel", p. 2 = Parisian version)

References

1982 births
21st-century Canadian novelists
Canadian male novelists
Canadian novelists in French
People from Saint-Armand, Quebec
Writers from Quebec
French Quebecers
Living people
Governor General's Award-winning fiction writers
21st-century Canadian male writers